Los Túneles subterráneos de San Germán is a vaulted brick storm sewer system built in 1835 underneath the urban center of San Germán, Puerto Rico. The system is made of a central tunnel and several smaller side tunnels. The construction is of brick and rubble with modern concrete repairs. The vaulted brick branches, most of them abandoned and sealed, date mostly from before 1910. The tunnel sections built up to 1918 are listed on the National Register of Historic Places as Alcantarilla Pluvial sobre la Quebrada Manzanares.

See also

 San Germán Historic District

Notes

References

External links
 
 Los Tuneles.Information from the city of San Germán (Spanish)

Tunnels completed in 1835
Infrastructure on the National Register of Historic Places in Puerto Rico
Buildings and structures in San Germán, Puerto Rico
Tunnels in Puerto Rico
Historic district contributing properties in Puerto Rico
1835 establishments in Puerto Rico
Sewerage infrastructure on the National Register of Historic Places
Infrastructure completed in 1835
Tunnels on the National Register of Historic Places
Water supply and sanitation in Puerto Rico